Hagnagora ephestris is a species of moth of the family Geometridae. It is found in Colombia.

Both H. ephestris and related H. discordata show a pronounced yellow blotch on the hindwings that is absent in H. luteoradiata. Different from H. discordata, the yellow transversal band on the forewing of H. ephestris reaches the outer margin of the wing. Moreover, the band is broader than in H. discordata, whereas the yellow field of the hindwing is narrower, particularly in the proximate half of the wing.

References

Moths described in 1927
Larentiinae
Moths of South America